The 1954 Missouri Tigers baseball team represented the University of Missouri in the 1954 NCAA baseball season. The Tigers played their home games at Rollins Field. The team was coached by Hi Simmons in his 16th season at Missouri.

The Tigers won the College World Series, defeating Rollins College 4-1 in the final.

Season Recap

College World Series
In the first round, Missouri defeated the Lafayette Leopards by a score of 6-3. Missouri was then knocked into the loser's bracket after a 4-1 second-round loss to Art Brophy and Rollins College. Behind lefthander Ed Cook, the Tigers then defeated the UMass Minutemen 8-1.

Missouri defeated Oklahoma A&M Aggies 7-3 in the behind a strong outing from starting pitcher Norm Stewart and home runs from Jerry Schoonmaker and George Gleason. Tied 3-3 with the Michigan State Spartans heading into the ninth inning, Emil Kammer singled home Buddy Cox to propel Missouri into the championship game for a rematch against Rollins College and Art Brophy.

Missouri bested Rollins 4-1 in the championship game behind a great outing from Ed Cook and a Buddy Cox home run.

With seven triples, Missouri tied Holy Cross's record for triples in a College World Series.

Roster

Schedule

Awards and honors 
Jerry Schoonmaker
First Team All-American 
All-District V 
Led NCAA with six home runs

Emil Kammer
All-District V

Bob Musgrave
All-District V

Team Photo

References

Missouri Tigers baseball seasons
Missouri
College World Series seasons
NCAA Division I Baseball Championship seasons
Big Eight Conference baseball champion seasons